Rodolfo Kumbrevicius (Chinese: 罗多福; born 13 July 1981), sometimes known as Alemão, is a Brazilian former professional footballer who played as a forward.

Career
Kumbrevicius trialled with Norwegian club Molde in July 2004.

Germany
Arriving at VfL Oldenburg on 9 July 2005, Rodolfo hit three goals during his first friendly appearance between Oldenburg's senior and youth sides at the summer festival, but was out with a hip injury that October, and had to leave a month later seeing that his father was seriously ill.

Lithuania
Participating in FC Vilnius' 2007 training camp in Turkey, the Brazilian regarded the top division as very physical, but was attacked by FBK Kaunas trainer Angel Chervenkov that June, who was fined. However, the moribund Vilnius were eventually dissolved and ceased to exist by 2008.

Kuwait
Working out on a move to Al Sahel SC as August 2007 got underway, Kumbrevicius was offered the possibility of adding another year to his contract at the conclusion of the season, but decided to postpone the chance to review other offers.

China
Rewarded a deal at Jiangsu Sainty mid-season 2009, the then 28-year old replaced Qin Sheng away to Shanghai Shenhua. Listening to the fans advice to give him more game time, Pei Encai started him as Jiangsu held Qingdao Jonoon 0–0 but he was unable to register a shot the entire first half, going on to appear four more times without a goal.

Malta
Unveiled as one of Birkirkara's 2011 additions, the target man stated that Maltese football needed to improve on management and the quality of pitches. Debuting during the Stripes 1–0 victory over Vittoriosa Stars, he was shown the door alongside three other foreign imports as the summer got underway.

Personal life
His grandfather from the country, he is able to speak basic phrases in Lithuanian.

References 

Living people
1981 births
Brazilian footballers
Association football forwards
Chinese Super League players
Kuwait Premier League players
Raufoss IL players
VfL Oldenburg players
Esporte Clube XV de Novembro (Piracicaba) players
F.C. Penafiel players
FC Vilnius players
Al-Sahel SC (Kuwait) players
Jiangsu F.C. players
Vitória Futebol Clube (ES) players
Batatais Futebol Clube players
Birkirkara F.C. players
Esporte Clube Santo André players
Brazilian people of Lithuanian descent
Brazilian expatriate footballers
Brazilian expatriate sportspeople in Norway
Expatriate footballers in Norway
Brazilian expatriate sportspeople in Germany
Expatriate footballers in Germany
Brazilian expatriate sportspeople in Portugal
Expatriate footballers in Portugal
Brazilian expatriate sportspeople in Lithuania
Expatriate footballers in Lithuania
Brazilian expatriate sportspeople in Kuwait
Expatriate footballers in Kuwait
Brazilian expatriate sportspeople in China
Expatriate footballers in China
Brazilian expatriate sportspeople in Malta
Expatriate footballers in Malta